Manchali is a Pakistani drama series that first aired on Geo Entertainment on 25 April 2016. It is produced by Babar Javed. The lead cast is Sami Khan, Rabab Hashim, and Zainab Jamil.

It marks the fourth on-screen joint appearance of Sami Khan and Rabab Hashim after Piya Mann Bhaye, Anaya Tumhari Hui, and Ishqaaway. After this serial they also appeared on Mannat together. In total they have appeared in five series as a couple, which were all broadcast on Geo Entertainment.

Synopsis 
Manchali is a story of two cousins, Ambreen and Afsheen, who are polar opposites but promise to stand with each other through thick and thin.  Ambreen is often disliked by her family because of her exuberant and outspoken nature while Afsheen is an innocent and kind-hearted girl who is in love with her next door neighbour, Arham.  Arham lives with his mother, Surya Begum, and sister, Seema.

Afsheen’s love life is challenged when Moonis, who is Arham’s family friend and a potential groom for Seema, falls in love with Ambreen. To avoid complications between Arham and Afsheen’s relationship, Ambreen is afraid to reciprocate his feelings. Upon knowing Moonis’ interest, Surya Begum plans to get rid of Afsheen and Ambreen. On the other hand, Arham is constantly instigated against Afsheen and he starts to lose trust in her.  While Afsheen faces challenges in her marital life, Ambreen is bothered about her relationship with Moonis.  Will the four of them be able to save their relationships or will they fall prey to their family politics?

Cast
Sami Khan as Monas
Rabab Hashim as Ambreen
Zainab Jameel as Afsheen
Manzoor Qureshi
Shaheen Khan as Afsheen's mother
Shazia Gohar
Hamid
Gul-e-Rana
Sidra Sajid
Adnan Shah Tipu
Shahida Murtaza
Rameez Siddiqui
Parwasha
Mustafa Qureshi
Humera Zahid
Hina Rizvi as Nasreen
Parveen Soomro

Soundtrack 
The original soundtrack for Manchali is "Awara Parinda" which is composed by Shuja Haider and the vocals are provided by Ghazal Ali & Nauman Shafi.

See also
 List of programs broadcast by Geo TV
 Geo TV
 List of Pakistani television serials

External links

Geo TV original programming
A&B Entertainment
2016 Pakistani television series debuts